The fallacy of accent (also referred to as accentus, from its Latin denomination, and misleading accent) is a type of ambiguity that arises when the meaning of a sentence is changed by placing an unusual prosodic stress, or when, in a written passage, it is left unclear which word the emphasis was supposed to fall on. Later writers have extended the fallacy to ambiguity caused in sentences due to grammar as well.

History

Among the thirteen types of fallacies in his book Sophistical Refutations, Aristotle lists a fallacy he calls  (prosody), later translated in Latin as accentus. While the passage is considered obscure, it is commonly interpreted as referring to the ambiguity that emerges when a word can be mistaken for another by changing suprasegmental phonemes, which in Ancient Greek correspond to diacritics (accents and breathings). Since words stripped from their diacritics do not exist in the Ancient Greek language, this notion of accent was troublesome for later commentators.

Whatever the interpretation, in the Aristotelian tradition the fallacy remains roughly confined to issues of lexical stress. It is only later that the fallacy came to identify shifts in prosodic stress.

Example

I didn't take the test yesterday. (Somebody else did.)
I didn't take the test yesterday. (I did not take it.)
I didn't take the test yesterday. (I did something else with it.)
I didn't take the test yesterday. (I took a different one.)
I didn't take the test yesterday. (I took something else.)
I didn't take the test yesterday. (I took it some other day.)

See also
Innuendo
Quoting out of context
Syntactic ambiguity

References

Ambiguity
Syntax
Verbal fallacies